Tylomelania masapensis is a species of freshwater snail with an operculum, an aquatic gastropod mollusk in the family Pachychilidae.

The specific name masapensis is named after Lake Masapi, where it lives.

Distribution 
This species occurs in Malili Lakes, Sulawesi, Indonesia. Its type locality is Lake Masapi.

Ecology 
Tylomelania masapensis is a lacustrine species.

The females of Tylomelania masapensis usually have 1-5 embryos in their brood pouch. Newly hatched snails of Tylomelania masapensis have a shell height of 0.3-10.0 mm.

References

masapensis
Gastropods described in 1913